Parshuram Trimbak Kulkarni (1660–1718), popularly known as Parshuram Pant Pratinidhi, was a Minister (Pradhan) and Count (Sardar) of the Maratha Empire. He served as Pratinidhi (Chief Delegate) during Rajaram I and Tarabai’s reign. His contribution to the War of 27 years is considered to be of vital importance. He was also the founder of the princely states of Vishalgad and Aundh in Maharashtra.

The first hereditary recipient of the title 'Pratinidhi', meaning 'the representative of the king' or viceroy, was Parshuram Trimbak Pant, who was a recorder and interpreter at the court of Shivaji. The title Pratinidhi was conferred upon him in 1698 by Rajaram, the second son of Shivaji.

Life

Early life
Parshuram Trimbak was born in 1660 in Kanhai village in a Deshastha Brahmin family. His father Trimbak Krishna was a devotional and pious village officer of Kanhai.

Career
Parashuram started his career as a clerk, but his abilities and valour enabled him, during the reign of Rajaram, to repel the attacks of Mughal emperor in Maharashtra. He succeeded in the recovery of Satara, Panhala and other fortresses and in re-establishing Maratha power. He had already been a nobleman but in view of his meritorious services, Rajaram conferred upon him the title of Pratinidhi, after the death of Pralhad Niraji, the first holder of the office. Rajaram was succeeded by his wife Tarabai who retained Parashuram Trimbak as Pratinidhi.

Death  
Parshuram Trimbak Pant Pratinidhi died in Mahuli, near Satara, in 1718 and was succeeded by his third son Shripatrao Pratinidhi as Pratinidhi of Aundh State and the Vishalgad estate was succeeded by his first son Krishnarao Pant Pratinidhi.

See also
 Pant Pratinidhi family

References

Bibliography

Further reading
‘Satarchya Pratinidhi Gharanyacha Itihas’ (Marathi) by Anant Narayan Bhagwat
‘Marathi Riyasat Volume II’ (Marathi) by Govind Sakharam Sardesai
‘Pant Pratinidhi Bakhar’ (Marathi)

People of the Maratha Empire
1660 births
1718 deaths